The Balcony is a 1963 film adaptation of Jean Genet's 1957 play The Balcony, directed by Joseph Strick. It stars Shelley Winters, Peter Falk, Lee Grant and Leonard Nimoy. George J. Folsey was nominated for an Academy Award for Best Cinematography. Ben Maddow was nominated for a Writers Guild of America Award. The film also credits the photographer Helen Levitt as an assistant director and Verna Fields as the sound editor.

Plot
Shelley Winters plays the madam of a brothel where customers play out their erotic fantasies, oblivious to a revolution that is sweeping the country. When her old friend, the chief of police (Peter Falk), asks her to impersonate the missing queen in order to reassure the people and halt the revolution, she offers instead that three of her customers play the general, bishop and chief justice, all of whom have died in the revolution.

Cast

Reception
Shortly after its release, the film was negatively reviewed by The New York Times critic Bosley Crowther, but favorably reviewed in Variety: "With Jean Genet's apparent approval, Joe Strick and Ben Maddow have eliminated the play's obscene language (though it's still plenty rough) and clarified some of its obscurations. The result is a tough, vivid and dispassionate fantasy."

Following the release of the DVD in 2000, Karl Wareham also reviewed the film favorably: "The Balcony is recommended for those who like an enigma of a film, one that tugs at your subconscious long after the titles fade. It’s a film that reaches to the very heart of why our society works in the way it does, and presents unrelenting questions and dilemmas."

Preservation
The Academy Film Archive preserved The Balcony in 2010.

See also
List of American films of 1963

References

External links
 
 

1963 films
American drama films
1963 drama films
1960s English-language films
American films based on plays
1960s American films